Ben Lyons is a critic.

Benjamin, Ben, or Bennie Lyons may also refer to:

Bennie Lyons (1882–?), American baseball player
Ben Lyons, character in The Lyons

See also
Ben Lyon